Gustavus Heinrich Schmelz (September 26, 1850 – October 14, 1925) was an American manager in Major League Baseball for the Columbus Buckeyes (1884), Cincinnati Red Stockings (1887–89), and Columbus Solons (1890–91) of the American Association. He was also the manager for the St. Louis Maroons (1886), Cleveland Spiders (1890), and Washington Senators (1894–97) of the National League. 

According to baseball historian Peter Morris, Schmelz was the first to capitalize on bunting, earning him the nickname "the Father of the Bunt". In 1891, Sporting Life referred to a player's habit of bunting as the "Schmelz system".

He was regarded as a player's manager, but his camaraderie with his players did not translate to pennants, as he never finished higher than second place. His lifetime managerial record was 624–703 (.470).

Schmelz died in his birthplace of Columbus, Ohio at age 75 and is buried at Green Lawn Cemetery.

References

External links

Baseball-Reference.com – career managing record

1850 births
1925 deaths
Columbus Buckeyes managers
St. Louis Maroons managers
Cincinnati Red Stockings managers
Cleveland Spiders managers
Columbus Solons managers
Washington Senators (NL) managers
Washington Senators (1891–1899) managers
Minor league baseball managers
Baseball coaches from Ohio
Sportspeople from Columbus, Ohio
Burials at Green Lawn Cemetery (Columbus, Ohio)